MPPF, with the full name 2'-methoxyphenyl-(N-2'-pyridinyl)-p-fluoro-benzamidoethyipiperazine, is a compound that binds to the serotonin-1A receptor. Labeled with fluorine-18 it has been used as a radioligand with positron emission tomography.
It has, e.g., been used to examine the difference in neuroreceptor binding in the human brain across sex and age.

See also 
 WAY-100,635

References 

Phenol ethers
Phenylpiperazines
Fluoroarenes
Benzamides
2-Pyridyl compounds